The Sun Odyssey 42 is a French sailboat that was designed by Guy Ribadeau Dumas, as a cruiser and first built in 1990.

The Sun Odyssey 42 was followed in production by a series of unrelated designs with similar names and intended markets, including the 1992 Sun Odyssey 42.1, the 1995 Sun Odyssey 42.2, the 1996 Sun Odyssey 42 CC, the 2005 Sun Odyssey 42i and the 2007 Sun Odyssey 42 DS.

Production
The design was built by Jeanneau in France, from 1990 to 1992, but it is now out of production.

Design
The Sun Odyssey 42 is a recreational keelboat, built predominantly of fiberglass, with wood trim. It has a masthead sloop rig, a raked stem, a step-down reverse transom wiyth a swim platform, a partial skeg-mounted rudder controlled by a wheel and a fixed fin keel. It displaces  and carries  of ballast.

The design has sleeping accommodation for six people, with a double "V"-berth in the bow cabin, a semi-circular settee around a round table in the main cabin and twin aft cabins, each equipped with a double berth. The galley is located on the port side just forward of the companionway ladder. The galley is equipped with a two-burner stove, an ice box and a double sink. A navigation station is opposite the galley, on the starboard side. The head is located just aft of the bow cabin on the starboard side. There are also sinks located in each of then aft cabins on the centerline.

See also
List of sailing boat types

References

External links

Keelboats
1990s sailboat type designs
Sailing yachts
Sailboat type designs by Guy Ribadeau Dumas
Sailboat types built by Jeanneau